Crničani is a small village in the municipality of Mogila, North Macedonia. It used to be part of the former municipality of Dobruševo.

Demographics
According to the 2002 census, the village had a total of 41 inhabitants. Ethnic groups in the village include:

Macedonians 41

References

Villages in Mogila Municipality